Anindita Ghosh  is a British historian, and Professor of Modern Indian History at the University of Manchester.

Ghosh was born in India. She was educated at New Delhi, India (MA), and earned a PHD from the University of Cambridge.

Ghosh joined the University of Manchester in 2001. She is a Fellow of the Royal Historical Society.

References

Living people
Academics of the University of Manchester
Alumni of the University of Cambridge
Fellows of the Royal Historical Society
British women historians
Historians of India
Year of birth missing (living people)